Donncha Sheehan (born 24 August 1979) is an Irish sportsperson.  He plays hurling with his local club Adare and was a member of the Limerick senior inter-county team from 2003 until 2009. He was captain of the Limerick Under 21 team that won the 2000 All Ireland Under 21 Hurling Championship

References

1979 births
Living people
Adare hurlers
Adare Gaelic footballers
Limerick inter-county hurlers
People educated at Ardscoil Rís, Limerick